Francisco César Espinosa (25 November 1947 – 18 February 2001) was an Argentine racing driver. He competed in Turismo Carretera intermittently between 1971 and 1990, winning the championship in the 1979/80 season. Likewise, he became the first TC champion driving a Chevrolet Chevy and the first to do so under the self-regency imposed by the Asociación Corredores de Turismo Carretera, in response to the conflict between the Argentine Automobile Club and the Argentine Confederation of Sports Motoring. During his foray into the TC, he used the IKA Torino, Chevrolet Chevy and Ford Falcon, a car model that he would use due to disagreements with the team with which he obtained his championship. He retired from the TC on 16 December 1990 in Tandil.

Espinosa died on 18 February 2001 in his hometown, Chacabuco. During his career in the TC, he started in 119 races, winning two of them, both in the 1979-80 season.

References

1947 births
2001 deaths
Argentine racing drivers
Turismo Carretera drivers
Sportspeople from Buenos Aires Province